Det Bästa (Swedish: The Best) is the Swedish edition of the American Reader's Digest magazine. It has been in circulation since 1943. Its susbtitle is världens mest lästa tidskrift (Swedish: the world's most read magazine).

History and profile
Det Bästa was first published in March 1943 and is affiliated with the American magazine Reader's Digest. Barclay Acheson, director of the international editions of Reader's Digest, involved in the establishment of the magazine in Sweden. Det Bästa comes out monthly and is headquartered in Stockholm. Its publisher was Reader's Digest AB between 1989 and 1998 when the company was renamed as Det Beste AB.

Det Bästa is a news and general interest digest. The magazine had covered materials from its parent publication, Reader's Digest, until 2008 when it was redesigned to expand its content. Its editor-in-chief was Anna-Karin Rabe during this period.

References

External links

1943 establishments in Sweden
Conservatism in Sweden
Conservative magazines
General interest digests
Monthly magazines published in Sweden
Lifestyle magazines
Magazines established in 1943
Magazines published in Stockholm
Basta
Swedish-language magazines
News magazines published in Sweden